Gordontown (also Gordonton, Hanners Village, Hannersville) is an unincorporated community in Davidson County, North Carolina, United States.

Notes

Unincorporated communities in Davidson County, North Carolina
Unincorporated communities in North Carolina